Thomas Rennie is a -year-old Toronto Island ferry operated by the Parks, Forestry and Recreation Division of the City of Toronto government. She entered service in 1951, the most recent of the three ferries that bring visitors to the Toronto Islands during the summer months. She was named after a former member of the Toronto Harbour Commission.

History
Commissioned in 1950, the Rennie was built by the Toronto Dry Dock Company Limited. The ferry cost . It was built to replace the T. J. Clark, which was then transferred from passenger service to freight service.

She was built to carry 980 passengers. However, in 2007, Transport Canada published new passenger vessel regulations regarding damage stability (TP10943) requiring various upgrades to be implemented within prescribed compliance schedules. Thomas Rennie and her sistership Sam McBride, and William Inglis were also modernized under a life extension program while a fleet renewal process was undertaken.  A series of technical submissions to Transport Canada from the City's naval architectural engineering consultants took place through 2016.  These technical submissions supported Transport Canada's risk assessments that considered the ferry's operations and environmental limits.  Ultimately, Transport Canada approved the Rennie and McBride to be able to carry a total passenger complement of 915.   

In October 2012, Toronto City Council decided that funds should be set aside to replace Thomas Rennie and her two fleet-mates with new vessels. Replacement costs were estimated at  million per ferry.

Incidents
In 1953, the Rennie ran aground at Hanlan's Point in a fog. In July 1954, it crashed into the city wharf when it failed to reverse, injuring two passengers. In 1958, when water levels were low, the Rennie ran aground at Centre Island. A police launch was able to pull the Rennie free.

In 1959, while a maintenance man tested its engines, the Rennie moved slowly out of its Queen's Quay dock, unpiloted. She went out 100 yards into the harbour, and made a slow arc to the west, crashing into the wharf at the Terminal Warehouse. The boat's controls had been left in the 'dead slow ahead' position. The ship suffered minor hull damage and was repaired by Toronto Dry Dock.

In 1965, the Rennie had a stack fire when its engines overheated. The William Lyon Mackenzie fireboat was able to douse the flames while Toronto Harbour Police evacuated the passengers. In 1968, the Rennie crashed into Queen's Quay ferry dock when it failed to reverse its engines. Eight children and four adults were taken to hospital with non-life-threatening injuries. The collision damaged the dock but the ferry was not damaged.

In 1976, while on a party cruise, a 21-year-old male passenger fell into the harbour from the Rennie. The man spent several minutes in the water clinging to a ring buoy until Harbour Police arrived. He had to be treated for shock.

See also
 Ongiara
 Trillium

References

Ferries of Ontario
Water transport in Toronto
1951 ships